Kito is an island in the Lulunga district, part of the Ha'apai islands of Tonga.

See also

List of lighthouses in Tonga

References

Islands of Tonga
Haʻapai
Lighthouses in Tonga